Christopher Taylor (18 October 1899 – 16 March 1972) was an English footballer. His regular position was as a forward. He was born in Kings Norton, Birmingham. He played for Redditch United, Hyde United, and Manchester United.

External links
MUFCInfo.com profile

1899 births
1972 deaths
English footballers
Redditch United F.C. players
Manchester United F.C. players
Hyde United F.C. players
People from Kings Norton
Association football forwards